Louis Manton Shoobridge Sr. (25 October 1851 – 12 March 1939) was an Australian politician. He was born in New Norfolk. He unsuccessfully contested the 1914 Senate election as a  candidate and the 1919 election for the federal seat of Franklin as a  candidate. In 1921 he was elected to the Tasmanian Legislative Council as the Independent member for Derwent, serving until his retirement in 1937. His father Ebenezer Shoobridge, brother William Shoobridge, son Rupert Shoobridge and grandson Louis Shoobridge Jr. were all members of the Tasmanian Parliament.

References

 

1851 births
1939 deaths
Independent members of the Parliament of Tasmania
Members of the Tasmanian Legislative Council